A tax cut represents a decrease in the amount of money taken from taxpayers to go towards government revenue. Tax cuts decrease the revenue of the government and increase the disposable income of taxpayers. Tax cuts usually refer to reductions in the percentage of tax paid on income, goods and services. As they leave consumers with more disposable income, tax cuts are an example of an expansionary fiscal policy. Tax cuts also include reduction in tax in other ways, such as tax credit, deductions and loopholes.

How a tax cut affects the economy depends on which tax is cut. Policies that increase disposable income for lower- and middle-income households are more likely to increase overall consumption and "hence stimulate the economy". Tax cuts in isolation boost the economy because they increase government borrowing. However, they are often accompanied by spending cuts or changes in monetary policy that can offset their stimulative effects.

Types
Tax cuts are typically cuts in the tax rate. However, other tax changes that reduce the amount of tax can be seen as tax cuts. These include deductions, credits and exemptions and adjustments.

By expanding tax brackets, the government increases the amount of income that is subjected to lower tax rates.

Effects 

Since a tax cut represents a decrease in the amount of tax a taxpayer is obliged to pay, it results in an increase in disposable income. This greater income can then be used to purchase additional goods and services that otherwise would not have been possible.

Tax cuts result in workers being better off financially. With more money to spend, we would expect to see consumer spending to increase. Consumer spending is a large component of aggregate demand. This increase in aggregate demand can lead to an increase in economic growth, other things being equal. Tax cuts on income increase the after-tax rewards or working, saving and investing  and thereby they increase work effort, contributing to economic growth.

If tax cuts are not financed by immediate spending cuts, there is a chance that they can leading to an increase in the national budget deficit, which can hinder economic growth in the long-term through potential negative effects on investment through increases in interest rates. It also decreases national saving and therefore decreases the national capital stock and income for future generations. For this reason, the structure of the tax cut and the way it is financed is crucial for achieving economic growth.

Countries

United States 
Notable examples of tax cuts in the United States include:
The Tax Cuts and Jobs Act of 2017 lowered the corporate tax rate to 20%, while also lowering income tax rates, among other changes.
The 2008 American Recovery and Reinvestment Act included a tax credit of $400, lower payroll tax rates, and higher earned income tax credits.
 The Economic Growth and Tax Relief Reconciliation Act of 2001 reduced business and investment taxes.

History 
Another way to analyze tax cuts is to have a look at their impact. Presidents often propose tax changes, but the Congress passes legislation that may or may not reflect those proposals.

John Kennedy 

John Kennedy's plan was to lower the top rate from 91% to 65%, however, he was assassinated before implementing the change.

Lyndon Johnson 
Lyndon Johnson supported Kennedy's ideas and lowered the top income tax rate from 91% to 70%. He reduced the corporate tax rate from 52% to 48%.

Federal tax revenue increased from 94 billion dollars in 1961 to 153 billion in 1968.

Ronald Reagan 

In 1982 Ronald Reagan cut the top income tax rate from 70% to 50%. GDP increased 4.6% in 1983, 7.2% in 1984 and 4.2% in 1985.

In 1988, Reagan cut the corporate tax rate from 48% to 34%.

George W. Bush 

President Bush's tax cuts were implemented to stop the 2001 recession. They reduced the top income tax rate from 39.6% to 35%, reducing the long-term capital gains tax rate from 20% to 15% and the top dividend tax rate from 38.6% to 15%.

These tax cuts may have boosted the economy, however, they may have stemmed from other causes.

The American economy grew at a rate of 1.7%, 2.9%, 3.8% and 3.5% in the years 2002, 2003, 2004 and 2005, respectively.

In 2001, the Federal Reserve lowered the benchmark fed funds rate from 6% to 1.75%.

Apart from boosting the economy, these tax cuts increased the U.S. debt by $1.35 trillion over a 10-year period and benefited high-income individuals.

Barack Obama 

Barack Obama arranged for several tax cuts to defeat the Great Recession.

The $787 billion American Recovery and Reinvestment Act of 2009 promised $288 billion in tax cuts and incentives. Its taxation aspects included a payroll tax cut of 2%, health care tax credits, a reduction in income taxes for individuals of $400 and improvements to child tax credits and earned income tax credits.

To prevent the fiscal cliff in 2013, Obama extended the Bush tax cuts on incomes below $400,000 for individuals and $450,000 for married couples. Incomes exceeding the threshold were taxed at the rate of 39.6% (the Clinton-era tax rate), following the American Taxpayer Relief Act of 2012.

Donald Trump 

On December 22, 2017, President Trump signed the Tax Cuts and Jobs Act, which reduced the corporate tax rate from 35% to 20%.

Other changes included income tax rate cuts, doubling of the standard deduction, capping the state and local tax deduction and eliminating personal exemptions.

GDP growth rate increased by 0.7% in 2018, however, in 2019 it fell below 2017. In 2020, GDP took a sharp downturn, likely due to the COVID-19 pandemic.

Reasons

Governments may cite several reasons for cutting taxes.

Fairness 
To begin with, money belongs to the person who possesses it, particularly if they earned it. Reducing the amount of money that is taken by the government can be seen as increasing fairness. However, if tax cuts are financed by cutting government spending, it can be argued that this disproportionately disadvantages low-income earners, as cuts in spending will affect services used mostly by low-income earners, who pay proportionately less tax.

Efficiency 
Tax cuts can serve to increase efficiency in the market. Cutting taxes can lead to more efficient allocation of resources than would have been the case with higher taxes. Generally, private entities are more efficient with their spending than governments. Tax cuts allow private entities to use their money in a more efficient manner.

Incentives 
High taxes generally discourage work and investment. When taxes reduce the return from working, it is not surprising that workers are less interested in working. Taxes on income create a wedge between what the employee keeps and what the employer pays. Higher taxes encourage employers to create fewer jobs than they would with lower taxes.

Burden 
In the US, the overall tax burden in 2020 was equal to 16% of the total gross domestic product.

See also 
Laffer curve
Rahn curve
Reaganomics
Starve the beast
Trickle-down economics
S corporation
Tax reform

References

Tax policy